Alpha-N-acetylgalactosaminide alpha-2,6-sialyltransferase 1 is an enzyme that in humans is encoded by the ST6GALNAC1 gene. This enzyme adds a N-Acetylneuraminic acid (Sialic Acid/Neu5Ac) to an O-linked N-Acetylgalactosamine (GalNAc) on a peptide/proteins (also called Tn antigen) with an α2-6 linkage to produce the sialyl-Tn antigen. It has been shown that the enzyme prefers Thr over Ser containing GalNAc residues.

References

Further reading